Alan Navarro (born 31 May 1981) is an English former professional footballer who played as a midfielder.

Having come through the youth academy at Liverpool, he most notably played in the Football League with Tranmere Rovers, Macclesfield Town, Milton Keynes Dons and Brighton & Hove Albion. He also had spells with Crewe Alexandra, Chester City, Accrington Stanley and Swindon Town

Club career

Early career
Born in Liverpool, Merseyside, Navarro started his career at hometown club Liverpool, coming through the youth system before signing a professional contract with the club in the summer of 2000. On 22 March 2001, Navarro joined Crewe Alexandra on loan for six weeks, making eight appearances and scoring one goal.

Tranmere Rovers
On 9 November 2001, Navarro joined Tranmere Rovers on an initial two-month loan deal where he made two league appearances, scoring one goal. Liverpool also allowed Navarro to compete in the FA Cup whilst at Tranmere. It was in the FA Cup in which Navarro scored on his debut for the club in a 4–1 win over Brigg Town.

On 23 January 2002, Navarro joined Tranmere permanently on a three-and-a-half-year contract. Whilst at Tranmere, Navarro was loaned out twice, first joining Chester City for a month on 20 August 2004 before completing a three-month spell at Macclesfield Town which began on 15 December 2004. Navarro made 11 loan appearances for the club and scored one goal. On 12 May 2005, Navarro had his contract with Tranmere cancelled by mutual consent.

Macclesfield Town
On 12 September 2005, Navarro joined Conference National team Accrington Stanley on non-contract terms after a successful trial with the club. However, after three substitute appearances for Accrington Navarro joined previous loan club Macclesfield on 11 October 2005 on a permanent transfer.

Milton Keynes Dons
On 1 August 2007, Navarro joined Milton Keynes Dons (MK Dons) on an initial one-year contract. He signed a one-year contract extension at MK Dons on 11 December 2007. After making 77 league appearances and scoring two goals over two seasons at Milton Keynes, Navarro was released from his contract on 19 May 2009.

Brighton & Hove Albion
Navarro joined Brighton & Hove Albion on trial during the summer of 2009 with a view to earning a professional contract. Navarro started during the 2–0 pre-season friendly victory over AFC Wimbledon and was praised by manager Russell Slade for a good performance. Navarro also started during the 2–0 pre-season friendly victory at Scunthorpe United before signing a two-year contract with the League One club.

In May 2011, Brighton announced that he would not be issued a new deal following the ending of his current contract, but would be invited back to pre-season training to prove he is worth a new contract after an injury-hit season. He earned a one-year contract, and featured in 33 league games during the 2011–12 season, scoring his first goal for Brighton in a 2–1 win against Leeds United at Elland Road in the 90th minute on 11 February 2012. Navarro was released following the expiration of his contract at the end of April 2012.

Swindon Town
In June 2012 Navarro signed for Swindon Town on a free transfer. On his debut for Swindon he scored two goals to knock his former club Brighton out of the League Cup.

Career statistics

Honours
Milton Keynes Dons
Football League Trophy: 2007–08
Football League Two: 2007–08

References

External links
Alan Navarro player profile at the Brighton & Hove Albion website

1981 births
Living people
Footballers from Liverpool
English footballers
Association football midfielders
Liverpool F.C. players
Crewe Alexandra F.C. players
Tranmere Rovers F.C. players
Chester City F.C. players
Macclesfield Town F.C. players
Accrington Stanley F.C. players
Milton Keynes Dons F.C. players
Brighton & Hove Albion F.C. players
English Football League players
Swindon Town F.C. players